Richard N.W. Wohns is a neurosurgeon who is the founder and president of NeoSpine, LLC (a spine surgery and interventional pain management center). He has been listed one of the 50 Spine Surgeons and Specialists to Know by Becker's ASC Review. He currently practices and teaches medicine in the Puget Sound Region of Washington, United States.

Career
Wohns is a board certified neurosurgeon affiliated with St Francis Hospital, and Swedish Medical Center. He is the founder of NeoSpine which has offices in Seattle, Puyallup, and Poulsbo, Washington. Wohns is a pioneer of outpatient spine surgery and founded the  company, NeoSpine, which developed outpatient spine centers nationally. NeoSpine was acquired by Symbion, Inc., in 2008, then Symbion was acquired by Surgery Partners. Wohns continues to serve as special consultant for outpatient spine surgery. He was also a co-founder of U.S. Radiosurgery which was acquired by Alliance Oncology, Inc., in 2011. Wohns is director on the Board of Aqueduct Critical Care, Inc., health policy consultant to Nuvasive, and consultant and scientific advisor to a number of spinal device companies, and principal of Wohns Consulting Group.  Wohns is Chief Medical Officer of angelMD.

Since 1995, Wohns has been an associate clinical professor of Neurological Surgery at the University of Washington.

Wohns has been the physician for a number of mountain climbing expeditions including early in his career when he served as Medical Director for the Ultima Thule Everest Expedition in which high altitude brain research was performed. On a K2 expedition he performed an appendectomy on a Balti porter who perforated his appendix.

Wohns has performed over 3000 outpatient cervical and lumbar surgeries and his expertise includes outpatient and minimally invasive spine surgery, complex spine surgery, cervical and lumbar disc arthroplasty (artificial discs). He lectures both nationally and internationally and hosts yearly summits on the latest advancements in spine surgery techniques.

Current positions
Aqueduct Neurosciences, Director 
South Sound Neurosurgery Research & Education Institute, Director
Past-President, Western Neurosurgical Society,
Ranier Technology, Scientific Advisory Board 
Chief Medical Officer, angelMD

Awards and recognitions
In March 2014, Wohns was named in an article published on Becker's Hospital Review entitled 40 of the Smartest People in Healthcare. He was recognized in September 2013 in Becker's Spine Review as one of the 92 Spinal Surgeon Device Inventors and Innovators to Know. He was listed in 50 Spine Surgeons and Specialists to know by Becker's ASC Review in February 2010., He was recognized in 2009 as one of the top three Outstanding Health Care Executives – Metropolitan Region by the Seattle Business Journal.

References

American neurosurgeons
Living people
Physicians from Washington (state)
Harvard College alumni
Yale School of Medicine alumni
University of Washington Foster School of Business alumni
Seattle University School of Law alumni
Year of birth missing (living people)
American inventors